Rubén Rodríguez may refer to:

 Rubén Rodríguez (basketball) (born 1953), Puerto Rican former basketball player
 Rubén Rodríguez (footballer) (born 1967), former Uruguayan footballer
 Rubén Rodríguez (baseball) (born 1964), former Major League Baseball catcher
 Ruben Rodriguez (American football) (born 1965), former American football punter
 Ruben Rodríguez (chess player) (1946–1995)
 Ruben Rodriguez (Artist)  (born 2003)

See also
 Coliseo Rubén Rodríguez, a sporting arena named after the basketball player